The 2008 Arena Football League season was the 22nd season of the Arena Football League and final season before the 2009 season cancellation and subsequent bankruptcy of the original AFL corporate entity.  The regular season began play on February 29, 2008 and concluded on June 22. The playoffs began the following week, and ArenaBowl XXII was held in New Orleans, Louisiana on July 27 between the National Conference champion Philadelphia Soul and the American Conference champion San Jose SaberCats. This game was won by the Soul, 59–56.

Prior to the season, it was announced that the Austin Wranglers would move to the af2, and the Nashville Kats folded, thus leaving the league with 17 teams.  The Las Vegas Gladiators relocated to Cleveland.

Standings

  Clinched playoff berth
  Clinched division
  Clinched division and have conference's best record

Source: ArenaFan.com

Playoffs

Regular season statistics

Passing

Rushing

Receiving

All-Arena team

References

External links